Loop 343 is a  state-maintained roadway located in Austin, Texas.

History 

Loop 343 was formed on May 30, 1961 along the previous routes of SH 71 and US 290 as those roads were realigned. It passed through downtown Austin along 6th and 7th Streets to Lamar Boulevard.

It was rerouted on February 25, 1977 to use 1st Street (now Cesar Chavez Street) west of I-35. On November 10, 1986, the portion east of I-35 was removed from state maintenance, forming the current alignment.

Between 1978 and 2008, a segment of Cesar Chavez Street in downtown Austin was one-way eastbound. In 2008, as part of a larger public works project, the City of Austin converted Cesar Chavez Street back to two-way traffic along its entire length.

Route description 

Loop 343 begins in south Austin at the intersection of US 290/SH 71 and the southern terminus of Loop 360. It proceeds north along Lamar Boulevard for  towards downtown Austin. Here, it crosses Lady Bird Lake on the Lamar Boulevard Bridge. This segment of Loop 343 is a four-lane heavily-developed urban road.

This segment of Loop 343 is a four-lane downtown road.

Junction list

References 

343
Transportation in Austin, Texas
Transportation in Travis County, Texas